Nogometni klub Krško, commonly referred to as NK Krško or simply Krško, is a Slovenian football club from Krško which plays in the Slovenian Second League. The club was founded in 1922.

Honours
First team

Slovenian Second League
 Winners: 2014–15

Slovenian Third League
 Winners: 2001–02

Slovenian Fourth Division
 Winners: 1998–99

MNZ Celje Cup
 Winners: 2001–02, 2002–03, 2005–06, 2009–10, 2010–11

Reserve team

Slovenian Fifth Division
 Winners: 2010–11, 2012–13

League history since 1991

See also
List of NK Krško players

References

External links
Official website 
PrvaLiga profile 
NK Krško on Soccerway

 
Association football clubs established in 1922
Football clubs in Slovenia
Football clubs in Yugoslavia
1922 establishments in Slovenia
Krško